Arturo Cambroni (born 3 January 1953) is a Mexican cyclist. He competed in the sprint and 1000m time trial events at the 1972 Summer Olympics.

References

External links
 

1953 births
Living people
Mexican male cyclists
Olympic cyclists of Mexico
Cyclists at the 1972 Summer Olympics
Sportspeople from Michoacán